Arrival Ltd is a British electric vehicle manufacturer  headquartered in London, UK, of primarily lightweight commercial vehicles. In June 2020, Arrival announced a new passenger bus designed for coronavirus-era social distancing.

R&D takes place at their facility in Banbury, Oxfordshire. In March 2020, Arrival acquired a new factory in Bicester with plans to be operational by 2021 and start production in 2022. In December 2020, Arrival established its North American headquarters in Charlotte, North Carolina, USA. Arrival claims that their electric vehicles are the first EVs that cost the same as petrol and diesel equivalents. The company has created an electric vehicle platform that can be scaled to make many variants in multiple vehicle categories.

Arrival raised $118 million from US funds manager BlackRock in October 2020, adding to previous investment from Korean automaker Hyundai Motor Co and sister company Kia Motors Corp of $111 million. In November 2020, it was announced that Arrival would list on NASDAQ by merging with special-purpose acquisition company CIIG Merger Corp. 

In late May 2021, Arrival announced that it would be building electric cars for Uber ride-hailing drivers, with production expected in Q3 of 2023. In August 2021, Arrival President Avinash Rugoobur stated that the company would open a product development R&D center in India due to increasing interest from that market. In November 2021, the company announced that it would start production the following year.

In January 2023, the company cut 800 UK jobs, about half the remaining workforce, to reduce costs while seeking extra funding and planning to expand in the US to take advantage of green energy subsidies.

Vehicles

According to Arrival, four electric vehicle types are being developed: a bus, a van, a large van, and a small vehicle platform. Start of production of the bus is planned for the last quarter of 2021.

Van

U.S.-based United Parcel Service (UPS) has placed an order for 10,000 delivery vans from Arrival, with the option for an additional 10,000.

Bus

In June 2020, Arrival announced that the Arrival Bus was undergoing beta prototype testing. The company unveiled its prototype in November 2021, and said that production would commence at its South Carolina plant in the second quarter of 2022.

Car
Arrival has developed a car for the purpose of ride hailing. It has done so in partnership with Uber and in close consultation with Uber drivers. Arrival has also entered a partnership with Breathe, which will serve as the third-party distributor of the Arrival car.

History
Founded in 2015 by Russian telecoms billionaire businessman Denis Sverdlov, the former Deputy Minister of Mass Communications to the Kremlin who previously served as the General Director of the Yota Group, a Russian mobile service provider, Arrival is a global company with headquarters in Kensington, London and Charlotte, North Carolina, US. It has an R&D facility in Banbury, and offices in North America, Germany, Israel, Russia and the Netherlands. In 2021 Sverdlov was the company's majority owner, holding 76% of shares following the company's public listing on the NASDAQ stock exchange.

In August 2017, the Royal Mail announced an agreement with Arrival to trial nine vehicles in the ranges of 3.5, 6 and 7 tonnes GVW.

In May 2019, United Parcel Service announced a deal with Arrival to trial 35 vehicles across London and Paris as part of a wider strategy to electrify their massive fleet of delivery vehicles.

BlackBerry announced in October 2019 that they would be powering Arrival's Generation 2.0 intelligent electric vehicles. As part of the agreement, BlackBerry would license its BlackBerry QNX technology to Arrival, including its QNX SDP 7.0 real-time operating system, to serve as the secure foundation for ADAS features within the company's vehicle platform.

Mike Ableson, former Vice President of EV Infrastructure and Global Strategy at General Motors, joined Arrival in October 2019 as CEO of Automotive and North America.

In December 2019, Cubic Telecom, a connectivity management software provider, partnered with Arrival to deliver intelligent connectivity software to their electric vehicle fleets.

Arrival announced in January 2020 that Hyundai Motor Group and Kia Motors had invested €100 million in the company, marking the start of a strategic partnership between the automakers to accelerate the adoption of commercial electric vehicles globally. Following the investment, Arrival revealed that they had achieved "unicorn" status, valuing the start-up at €3 billion. Arrival plans to use  "microfactories" to build their electric vehicles having developed a "skateboard" platform containing a drive train and batteries.

On 29 January 2020, Arrival announced that UPS had invested in the company and placed an order for 10,000 Generation 2 electric vehicles to be rolled out across the UK, Europe and North America before 2024 as part of their transition towards a zero-emissions fleet. The deal was reported to be worth $400m along with an equity stake in the company of an undisclosed size. The purpose-built electric vehicles have been co-developed by Arrival and UPS in order to meet UPS's exact specifications, including the latest advanced control and safety features.

On 17 June 2020, Arrival revealed a zero-emission bus. The comopany said that it would be priced the same as a comparable diesel bus; lower running costs would make operating it cheaper for operators in the long term.

On 25 March 2021, the company went public on NASDAQ under ARVL symbol. The company was valued at more than US$15bn on the Nasdaq at its peak, dropping from 2022 to $250M in January 2023.

Arrival has established operations in the United States, with the Charlotte, North Carolina metro area serving as the company's U.S base of operations. Arrival's first U.S. office was in the South End neighborhood. The company's first U.S. microfactory in the nearby South Carolina suburb of Rock Hill was to produce buses. The company was investing $41.2M for its second microfactory in West Charlotte, where it planned to produce UPS delivery vans from mid-2022, with a workforce of 250.

In November 2021, it was reported that Arrival had non-binding orders or letters of intent for 64,000 vehicles.

In October 2022, the company announced job cuts amid relocation of its van production from Bicester to the US. It also announced restructuring of its business to focus on the US market by capitalising on the incentives from Inflation Reduction Act of 2022. In January 2023, it reduced its remaining UK workforce by half, to 800, to concentrate on the US and take advantage of green energy subsidies. The company also appointed Igor Torgov as its CEO.

Leadership 

 Chairman: Denis Sverdlov (since November 2022)
 Chief Executive: Igor Torgov

List of chairmen 

 Peter Cuneo (2021–2022)

List of chief executives 

 Denis Sverdlov (2016–2022)
 Igor Torgov (since 2023)

References

External links
 
 UK firm Charge gets investment boost from venture capitalist to develop range-extended electric powertrain technology (2015-09-29)

2015 establishments in England
British companies established in 2015
Companies listed on the Nasdaq
Truck manufacturers of the United Kingdom
Battery electric vehicle manufacturers
Motor vehicle manufacturers of England
Electric vehicle manufacturers of the United Kingdom
Vehicle manufacturing companies established in 2015
English brands
Companies based in Banbury
Motor vehicle manufacturers based in London
Special-purpose acquisition companies
Arrival (company)